Natalie Anne Gulbis (born January 7, 1983) is an American professional golfer who plays on the U.S.-based LPGA Tour.

Golf career
Gulbis was born and raised in the Sacramento, California, area. She has Latvian ancestry. Gulbis started finding interest in the game at the early age of four. By the time she reached age seven, she had won her first tournament, and at age ten, she reports she was breaking par.

She played in her first LPGA Tour event in 1997 as an amateur at the age of 14 (handicap of 2). Gulbis was the top player on the boys' golf team at Granite Bay High School and graduated at age 16. She then accepted a golf scholarship to the University of Arizona, the 2000 national champions, where she was a teammate of fellow freshman, Lorena Ochoa. After one season at Arizona, Gulbis left college to turn professional in July 2001 at age 18.  At the LPGA Final Qualifying Tournament in October 2001 at Daytona Beach, Florida, Gulbis finished tied for third to earn her card for the 2002 season.

Although Gulbis did not win a tournament until her sixth season on tour, she finished sixth on the LPGA money list in her fourth season with over $1 million in earnings in 2005. She placed in the top 10 in four consecutive major championships from the 2005 LPGA Championship to the 2006 Kraft Nabisco Championship.

Her first professional win came at the July 2007 Evian Masters in France, where she defeated Jeong Jang in a playoff. Gulbis tapped in for a two-putt birdie on the first extra hole to claim the winner's prize of $450,000.

Gulbis has played on three victorious U.S. Solheim Cup teams – 2005, 2007, and 2009.

Gulbis announced she will retire after the 2020 LPGA Tour season.

Personal life, business and media
Gulbis is an only child. She was considered to be a sex symbol in the LPGA. Natalie released a 2005 calendar, just before the 2004 U.S. Women's Open, which featured her not only playing golf, but also striking poses in swimwear.  The United States Golf Association (USGA) barred it from being sold at the event, deeming it inappropriate. The calendar was sold openly at Golf Canada; the USGA was criticized for overreacting. Gulbis also posed for the November 2004 issue of the magazine FHM, an issue that also gave away a chance to play golf with her at her home course, the Lake Las Vegas Resort, where her calendar photo shoot took place. Gulbis has said that she likes the attention she gets, even if it is for her appearance; she has endorsement deals with McGladrey LLP, TaylorMade/Adidas, Canon, Michelob Ultra, SkyCaddie, Payment Data Systems, MasterCard, Winn Golf Grips, Lake Las Vegas Resort, Pure Silk, Lexus, and EA Sports.

In 2006, Gulbis began writing a monthly advice column in FHM. In November 2005 a reality television show, The Natalie Gulbis Show, made its debut on The Golf Channel. The show had its second-season premiere on October 18, 2006. Gulbis also has appeared on the 2007 version of Tiger Woods PGA Tour by EA Sports, along with fellow professionals, Annika Sörenstam, Ian Poulter, and Luke Donald, among others.  In August 2007 Gulbis appeared on the August/September cover of Sactown Magazine in an article that profiled the rising star's busy life of product endorsements and photo shoots, though, no pro win. Gil Ozir, Vice President of Marketing for Raymond Weil, a luxury watchmaker and one of Gulbis' endorsement deals, was quoted as saying, "Once she starts winning, she's going to be a megastar".  A few days later, Gulbis won the Evian Masters, her first professional LPGA title.

In 2009, Gulbis appeared in the second season of Celebrity Apprentice. Throughout the season, each celebrity raised money for a charity of their choice; Gulbis selected the Boys and Girls Club. She was fired on the April 19, 2009 episode of the show.

Gulbis appeared on the April 28, 2009, episode of The Price Is Right as a Showcase theme. She also participated in a playing Hole in One to perform the game's "inspiration putt". She appeared on Sports Jobs with Junior Seau, where Seau worked as her caddy during the pro-am round for the Safeway Classic in Oregon.

In 2010, she appeared in the tenth season of CSI: Crime Scene Investigation at the 12th episode "Long Ball".

Gulbis appeared in the 2012 Sports Illustrated Swimsuit Issue wearing only body paint.

Gulbis contracted malaria during the HSBC Women's Champions tournament in Singapore in late February 2013 and missed a tournament while recovering.

In July 2013, Gulbis became engaged to Josh Rodarmel, a former quarterback for Yale University. They were married in December.

In 2016, Gulbis spoke at the Republican National Convention in support of Donald Trump. There was speculation that she would run for the open 3rd congressional district of Nevada as a Republican in 2018.

In May 2018, President Donald Trump appointed Gulbis to serve as a member of his Council on Sports, Fitness & Nutrition.

Professional wins (1)

LPGA Tour (1)

LPGA Tour playoff record (1–1)

Results in LPGA majors
Results not in chronological order before 2015.

^ The Evian Championship was added as a major in 2013

CUT = missed the half-way cut
NT = no tournament
"T" tied

Summary

Most consecutive cuts made – 12 (2004 Kraft Nabisco – 2006 British Open)
Longest streak of top-10s – 4 (2005 LPGA - 2006 Kraft Nabisco)

LPGA Tour career summary

 Official through 2020 season 

* Includes matchplay and other events without a cut.

World ranking
Position in Women's World Golf Rankings at the end of each calendar year.

Team appearances
Professional
Solheim Cup (representing the United States): 2005 (winners), 2007 (winners), 2009 (winners)
Lexus Cup (representing International team): 2005 (winners), 2006, 2007, 2008 (winners)
World Cup (representing the United States): 2006
Wendy's 3-Tour Challenge (representing the LPGA Tour): 2006, 2007 (winners), 2008, 2009 (winners), 2010, 2011, 2012, 2013 (winners)

Solheim Cup Record

References

External links

Arizona Wildcats.com profile

American female golfers
Arizona Wildcats women's golfers
LPGA Tour golfers
Solheim Cup competitors for the United States
Golf writers and broadcasters
Golfers from Sacramento, California
Golfers from Nevada
Participants in American reality television series
The Apprentice (franchise) contestants
Nevada Republicans
American people of Latvian descent
People from Henderson, Nevada
1983 births
Living people